Richard Coady (born 1988) is an Irish hurler who plays for Carlow Senior Championship club Mount Leinster Rangers and at inter-county level with the Carlow senior hurling team. He usually lines out as a left wing-back.

Honours

Mount Leinster Rangers
Leinster Senior Club Hurling Championship (1): 2013
Carlow Senior Hurling Championship (8): 2006, 2007, 2009, 2011, 2012, 2013, 2017

Carlow
Joe McDonagh Cup (1): 2018
Christy Ring Cup (3): 2008, 2009, 2017

References

1988 births
Living people
Mount Leinster Rangers hurlers
Carlow inter-county hurlers